Fahad Salahuddin Tunio commonly known in Pakistan as Fahad Mustafa, is a Pakistani film and television actor and producer who is best known for hosting Jeeto Pakistan, a game show that airs on ARY Digital. Fahad has established himself as one of the leading and most popular actors in the Pakistani entertainment industry.

Early life
Mustafa was born in Karachi, Pakistan, to a Sindhi family. He is the son of the prominent Sindhi actor Salahuddin Tunio and has two brothers and one sister.

He studied to become a pharmacist at the Baqai Medical University in Karachi, but dropped out before completing his degree.

Career

Mustafa was first noticed in Sheeshay Ka Mahal. In 2008, he ventured into television production. His other notable television serials include Yeh Zindagi Hai, Haal-e-Dil, Bahu Rani, Ae Dasht-e-Junoon, Masuri, Aashti, Pul Siraat, Mastana Mahi, Main Abdul Qadir Hoon, and Koi Nahi Apna. He has been the host of the well-known game show Jeeto Pakistan since 2014.

He hosted the 1st Hum Awards ceremonies in 2013 in Karachi, and the 2nd ARY Film Awards in 2016 in Dubai. In 2017, he hosted the launching ceremony for the Karachi Kings, a Pakistan Super League team franchise. He then also hosted the opening ceremony of the 2017 Pakistan Super League in Dubai.

He made his film debut in 2014 in director Nabeel Qureshi's Na Maloom Afraad. It was declared a box office hit. In 2016, he starred in Anjum Shahzad's Mah e Mir and Qureshi's Actor in Law. Actor in Law did very well at the box office, winning Film of the Year Award in the 16th Lux Style Awards, where Mustafa also won the Best Actor Award for his role in the film. He then had a voice role in Sharmeen Obaid-Chinoy's animated film 3 Bahadur: The Revenge of Baba Balaam.

In 2017, he starred in Na Maloom Afraad 2, the sequel of 2014's NMA. In 2018, he starred in Nadeem Baig's Jawani Phir Nahi Ani 2 and Qureshi's Load Wedding; both of which released on same day, 22 August 2018.

He will also be producing three films; the first Anjum Shehzad's Band Toh Ab Bajay Ga, which will be written by Yasir Hussain; the second one will be written by Ali Imran under ARY Films banner; and a third one for which no details have been announced yet.

Personal life
Mustafa married Pakistani writer and actress Sana Fahad in 2006. The couple have a daughter and a son, born in April 2011 and January 2016, respectively.

Filmography

Films

Selected television

As host

As producer
(Under banner of Big Bang Entertainment)

Awards and nominations

! Ref
|-
! style="background:#bfd7ff" colspan="5"|Lux Style Awards
|-
|2009
|Kaisey Aye Karar
| Best TV Actor (Terrestrial)
| 
|-
| 2010
| Veena
| rowspan="6"|Best TV Actor (Satellite)
| 
|-
|2011
|Haal-e-Dil
|
|
|-
|rowspan="2"|2012
|Abdul Qadir – Main Abdul Qadir Hoon
|
|rowspan="2"|
|-
|Adal Soomro – Mastana Mahi
|
|-
|rowspan="2"|2014
|Murad – Daagh
|
|rowspan="2"|
|-
|Sikandar – Kankar
|
|-
|2015
|Farhan – Na Maloom Afraad
|Best Film Actor
|
|
|-
|rowspan="2"|2017
|Jamal/Mir – Mah e Mir
| rowspan="3"|Best Lead Actor in a Film 
|
|rowspan="2"|
|-
|Shan Mirza – Actor in Law
|
|-
|2018
|Farhan – Na Maloom Afraad 2
|
|
|-
|2019
|Raja – Load Wedding
|Best Film Actor (Critics' choice)
|
|
|-
! style="background:#bfd7ff" colspan="5"|Hum Awards
|-
|2013
|Jago Pakistan Jago
|Hum Award for Best Host
|
|
|-
|rowspan="4"|2014
|rowspan="2"|Sikandar – Kankar
|Hum Award for Best Actor
|
|rowspan="4"|
|-
|Hum Award for Best Actor Popular
|
|-
|rowspan="2"|Kankar (shared with Sanam Baloch)
|Hum Award for Best Onscreen Couple
|
|-
|Hum Award for Best Onscreen Couple Popular
|
|-
! style="background:#bfd7ff" colspan="5"|Hum Style Awards
|-
|2016
|Jeeto Pakistan
|Most Stylish TV Host
|
|
|-
! style="background:#bfd7ff" colspan="5"|International Pakistan Prestige Awards
|-
|2017
|Shan Mirza – Actor in Law
|Best Film Actor
|
|
|-
! style="background:#bfd7ff" colspan="5"|Pakistan International Film Festival
|-
|2018
|Shan Mirza – Actor in Law
|Best Actor (Male)
|
|
|}

Production Awards

Further reading 
The Express Tribune

References

External links
 
 
 
 

Living people
1983 births
Pakistani television hosts
Male actors from Karachi
Pakistani male television actors
Hum Award winners
Pakistani game show hosts
Sindhi people
ARY Digital people
Nigar Award winners
Male actors in Urdu cinema
Male actors in Urdu television